Persicula deburghi is a species of sea snail, a marine gastropod mollusk, in the family Cystiscidae.

References

deburghi
Gastropods described in 1864
Cystiscidae